Hiroshi Takahashi may refer to:

, Japanese architect
, Japanese manga artist
 Hiroshi Takahashi (baseball) (born 1946), Japanese baseball player (See 1964 in baseball)
 Hiroshi Takahashi (botanist) (born 1960), (See Tricyrtis chinensis)
 Hiroshi Takahashi (screenwriter) (See J-Horror Theater)
, Japanese table tennis player
 Hiroshi Takahashi, chief of staff in the Japanese Korean Army